Boyhood may refer to:

the state or period of a male being a boy
Boyhood (1951 film), a 1951 film by Keisuke Kinoshita
Boyhood (2014 film), a 2014 film by Richard Linklater
Boyhood (novel), an 1854 novel by Leo Tolstoy
Boyhood: Scenes from Provincial Life, a 1997 book by J. M. Coetzee

See also 

 Childhood
 Girlhood (disambiguation)